Miss Universe Barbados is the national beauty pageant for selecting a delegate to represent Barbados at the Miss Universe pageant. The current titleholder is Hillary-Ann Williams of Bridgetown.

History 
Miss Barbados Universe sent its first contestant to Miss Universe in 1976 and has sent 11 delegates between 1976 and 2005. They have never sent a delegate for more than 5 years in a row. After the death of the national director Andy Niles in 2006, Candi Nicholls, a former member of Niles' team, took over the franchise. Niles had been national director from 2003 to 2005.

Between 2008 and 2015 Barbados was absent from the Miss Universe pageant.

Since 2016, Crown Events Inc. with national director Brian Green are the new management of the franchise.

Titleholders

See also 
Miss Universe

References

External links
 www.missuniversebarbados.org

Beauty pageants in Barbados
1976 establishments in Barbados
Barbadian awards
Barbados